Mike Hopkins is an American politician. He serves as a Republican member of the Montana House of Representatives, where he represents District 92, including parts of Missoula, Montana.

References

Living people
Politicians from Missoula, Montana
Republican Party members of the Montana House of Representatives
Year of birth missing (living people)
21st-century American politicians